Chasmatopora is an extinct genus of bryozoans which existed in what is now Mongolia, China, Estonia, Russia, Poland, Argentina, the United States and Canada. It was described by Alcide d'Orbigny in 1849, and the type species is Chasmatopora tenella, which was originally described as a species of Retepora by Eichwald in 1842.

Species
 Chasmatopora aperta Kopajevich, 1984
 Chasmatopora disparilis Liu, 1980
 Chasmatopora extensa Liu, 1980 
 Chasmatopora flexa Zheng, 1990
 Chasmatopora livonica (Nekhoroshev, 1960) 
 Chasmatopora moyeroensis Nekhoroshev, 1955
 Chasmatopora pusilla Astrova, 1965 
 Chasmatopora silurica (Kopaevich, 1975)
 Chasmatopora sublaxa Ulrich, 1890 
 Chasmatopora hypnoides (Sharpe, 1853) 
 Chasmatopora tenella (Eichwald, 1842)
 Chasmatopora tricellata (Nekhoroshev, 1955)
 Chasmatopora rossae Ernst & Carrera, 2012

References

Fenestrida
Stenolaemata genera
Prehistoric bryozoan genera
Fossil taxa described in 1849
Paleozoic life of Nunavut
Extinct bryozoans